Lochinvar is a village in the Hunter Region of New South Wales, Australia, eleven kilometres west of the regional centre of Maitland. Lochinvar is within the boundaries of the City of Maitland local government area and is named after Lochinvar, a loch in southern Scotland. A historic home and property called "Windermere" (1821) is located near the town. There is also a locally famous country department store called "Aird's of Lochinvar" on the Maitland side.

Education
On the highway through the town is a large Catholic convent housing the Sisters of St Joseph (1883). There is a secondary college on the grounds, St Joseph's College - a coeducational college which caters for students from Years 7–12. It was once also a boarding school for girls. It is also the site of Lochinvar Public School, as well as St Patrick's Lochinvar, the local Catholic primary school.

Transport
The town is mostly built up along the busy New England Highway between the major centres of Maitland and Singleton and is 165 kilometres north of Sydney. Most people in the area work in nearby Maitland or Singleton. Lochinvar railway station is some two kilometres south of the village.

Hunter Valley Buses runs two bus routes through the village of Lochinvar:
179: Stockland Greenhills to North Rothbury via East Maitland, Maitland, Rutherford, Greta, Branxton.
180: Stockland Greenhills to Singleton Heights via East Maitland, Maitland, Rutherford, Greta, Branxton and Singleton.

Notable people
 Actress sisters Abbie and Isabelle Cornish were born in the village in 1982 and 1994 respectively.

References

Suburbs of Maitland, New South Wales